The 2012 Washington gubernatorial election took place on November 6, 2012. Candidates in the election were chosen in an August 7, 2012 primary election, under the state's nonpartisan blanket primary system, which allows voters to vote for any candidate running in the race, regardless of party affiliation. The two candidates who received the most votes in the primary election qualified for the general election.

Incumbent Democratic Governor Christine Gregoire decided to retire rather than seek a third term. She endorsed fellow Democrat Jay Inslee, a U.S. Congressman, as her successor. On March 20, 2012, Inslee resigned from Congress in order to focus on his gubernatorial campaign.

Inslee and Republican Rob McKenna, the Attorney General of Washington, advanced to the general election. Inslee narrowly won the election, and McKenna conceded three days later.

Primary election

Democratic candidates
 Rob Hill
 Jay Inslee, U.S. Representative for WA-01 (1999–2012) and WA-04 (1993–1995)

Declined
 Lisa Brown, State Senate Majority Leader
 Dow Constantine, King County Executive
 Christine Gregoire, incumbent Governor
 Jim McIntire, State Treasurer
 Aaron Reardon, Snohomish County Executive
 Ron Sims, former King County Executive and Deputy Secretary of Housing and Urban Development
 Brian Sonntag, State Auditor

Republican candidates 
 Shahram Hadian, pastor and small business owner
 Javier O. Lopez
 Rob McKenna, Attorney General of Washington
 Max Sampson

Declined
 Dave Reichert, U.S. Representative

Independent candidates 
 Christian Joubert
 L. Dale Sorgen, computer programmer and former pastor
 James White

Polling

Results

General election

Candidates
Jay Inslee (Democratic), former U.S. Representative
Rob McKenna (Republican), Attorney General of Washington

Debates
Complete video of debate, October 2, 2012 - C-SPAN

Predictions

Endorsements

Polling
Aggregate polls

Christine Gregoire vs. Rob McKenna

Christine Gregoire vs. Dave Reichert

Jay Inslee vs. Dave Reichert

Lisa Brown vs. Rob McKenna

Results
The race was close throughout the night, with results too close to call after 60 percent of ballots were cast. Inslee was declared the winner early in the morning three days later; McKenna conceded later in the evening.

Inslee won only eight of the state's 39 counties, relying on heavy votes from the Seattle metropolitan area pushing him to victory.

Results by county

Counties that flipped from Democratic to Republican 

Island (largest city: Oak Harbor)
Kitsap (largest city: Bremerton)
Pierce (largest city: Tacoma)
Skagit (largest city: Mount Vernon)

By congressional district
Inslee won 5 of 10 congressional districts with the remaining 5 going to McKenna, including both districts that were previously represented by Inslee.

See also
2016 Washington gubernatorial election

Notes

Partisan clients

References

External links
 Elections & Voting at the Washington Secretary of State office

Official campaign websites
 Jay Inslee (D) for Governor
 Rob McKenna (R) for Governor
 Shahram Hadian (R) for Governor

Washington
Governor
Jay Inslee
2012